The 3rd FINA World Junior Synchronised Swimming Championships was held August 27–30, 1993 in Leeds, Great Britain. The synchronised swimmers are aged between 15 and 18 years old, swimming in three events: Solo, Duet and Team.

Participating nations

Australia 
Austria 
Belarus 
Brazil 
Bulgaria 
Canada 
China 
Czech Republic 
Egypt 
France 
Germany 
Great Britain 
Hungary 
Italy 
Japan 
Kazakhstan 
Mexico 
Netherlands 
New Zealand 
Poland 
Russia 
Slovakia 
South Africa 
Spain 
Sweden 
Switzerland 
Ukraine 
United States

Results

References

FINA World Junior Synchronised Swimming Championships
1993 in synchronized swimming
Swimming
Jun
International aquatics competitions hosted by the United Kingdom
International sports competitions hosted by England
1990s in West Yorkshire